Mario Vitale (1923–2003) was an Italian film actor. Vitale was a fisherman chosen by Roberto Rossellini to star alongside Ingrid Bergman in the 1950 film Stromboli. He played prominent roles in several other films until the mid-1950s.

Filmography

References

Bibliography 
 Bondanella, Peter. The Films of Roberto Rossellini. Cambridge University Press, 1993.

External links 
 

1923 births
2003 deaths
Italian male film actors
People from Salerno
20th-century Italian people